King Salman International University (Arabic: جامعة الملك سلمان) is a national (Ahleya), non-profit Egyptian university located in Sinai across three campuses in Ras Sedr, El Tor and Sharm El Sheikh. The university includes 13 faculties in different fields of study. It was established in August 2020 by a decision of Abdel Fattah El-Sisi, President of Egypt, and was named after Salman of Saudi Arabia.

Location 
King Salman International University has three campuses in South Sinai in the cities of Ras Sedr, Al Tur and Sharm El Sheikh, each containing a number of faculties.

Studying System 
The study at the university is based on the credit hour system that allows students to choose the courses they register to study in each semester, under academic guidance that tracks the student’s progress and ability to continue their studies

Faculties and Centers 
King Salman International University contains 13 faculties, and offers 33 programs in fields of study ranging from medicine, science, engineering, media, arts, hospitality and communicationز

Faculties:

Ras Sedr Branch
 Faculty of Administrative Sciences
 Faculty of Desert Agriculture
 Faculty of Veterinary Medicine
 Faculty of Pharmacy
 Faculty of Basic Sciences
 Faculty of Community Sciences

El Tor Branch
 Faculty of Enginieering
 Faculty of Computer Science and Engineering
 Faculty of Technological Industries
 Faculty of Medicine
 Faculty of Dentistry
 Faculty of Nursing

Sharm El Sheikh Branch
 Faculty of Al Alsun and Applied Languages
 Faculty of Art and Design 
- interior architecture

- graphic design and branding 
 Faculty of Tourism and Hospitality
 Faculty of Architecture

Faculty of Engineering
the faculty offers the following programs:
Mechanical Engineering Department:
Mechatronics Engineering Program.
Electrical Engineering Department:
Renewable Energy Engineering Program.
Electronics & Communications Engineering Program.
Computer Engineering Program.
Artificial Intelligence Engineering Program.

References 

Universities in Egypt
Research institutes in Egypt
Science and technology in Egypt
South Sinai Governorate
Educational institutions established in 2020
2020s establishments in Egypt